PN may refer to:

Arts and entertainment 
 Purple Noon, a 1960 film
 Patriotic Nigras, a griefing group in the game Second Life

Business and economics 
 Pacific National, a rail freight company in Australia
 Participatory notes, issued to unregistered overseas investors in Indian stock markets
 Pennsylvania Northeastern Railroad (reporting mark PN)
 Promissory note, a contract where one party makes an unconditional promise in writing to pay a sum of money to another
 West Air (China) (IATA airline code PN)

Organizations

Navies 
 Pakistan Navy
 Peruvian Navy
 Philippine Navy
 Portuguese Navy

Political parties 
 National Renaissance Front, Partidul Naţiunii, a political party in Romania
 Partit Nazzjonalista, a political party in Malta
 Perikatan Nasional, a political coalition in Malaysia
 Partido Nacional (Uruguay), a political party in Uruguay

Places 
 Penang
 Pitcairn Islands (ISO 3166-1 country code)
 Palmerston North, a city in New Zealand
 Province of Pordenone, a province in the autonomous region of Friuli Venezia Giulia in Italy

Science, technology, and mathematics

Biology 
 Parenteral nutrition
 Phylogenetic nomenclature, an approach to naming groups of living things

Electronics and computing 
 .pn, the country code top level domain (ccTLD) for Pitcairn Islands
 p–n junction, a type of junction in electronics

Mathematics 
 Path graph of size , denoted by 
 Petri net, one of several mathematical modeling languages for the description of distributed systems
 Polish notation, a prefix notation proposed by Jan Łukasiewicz
 Polynomial vector spaces, denoted by 
 Pseudorandom number sequence

Other uses in science and technology 
 Part number, an identifier of a particular part design used in a particular industry
 Particle number, in air-quality measurement
 petanewton, a quadrillion newtons
 Planetary nebula, in astronomy
 Post-Newtonian expansion, an approximation of General Relativity
 Proportional navigation, a concept in missile guidance systems
 Pseudorandom noise, a deterministic sequence of pulses used in spread spectrum communication and rangefinding
 Phosphorus mononitride (PN), an inorganic compound found in space

Other uses 
 Pottery Neolithic
 Proper noun, a linguistic term for the name of an entity
 Public News, an alternative newspaper in Houston (1982-1998)